Member institutions of the University of London are colleges and universities that are members of the federal University of London. The University of London was initially configured as an examining board for affiliated colleges, but was reconfigured as a teaching university for London, with many London colleges becoming schools of the university, in 1900. Since the 1990s it has trended towards much greater autonomy for its colleges. Common assessment standards by subject no longer exist across the university nor is shared teaching or cross-registration commonplace.

The evolution towards greater decentralization within the university has had three major impacts functionally. First, member institutions have taken different approaches in emphasizing their ties to the federal university (for example in formal branding or via participation in shared services such as intercollegiate housing for London based students). Second, because select member institutions have autonomous degree granting powers apart from the federal university, while all students who complete their studies are deemed graduates of the federal university itself, only some students are deemed graduates of the specific member institution that supported their studies. For instance, the London School of Economics only awards LSE degrees and confers alumni status to students who complete some portion of their studies at the LSE. In contrast, the several thousand students studying on LSE directed degrees externally receive a University of London degree and are not deemed alumni of the LSE proper. Finally, the federal university has purposefully exercised little discipline over subject content or the development of new academic programs such that duplicate programs are commonplace. For example, eight member institutions now offer some version of a qualifying first professional degree in law, several have launched statistics programs to meet growing demand for the field.

History
The institutions that make up the university of London have been referred to by a number of different terms historically. From federation in 1900 until the passing of the University of London Act 1994 they were formally "schools of the university" or (until 1978) "colleges incorporated into the university", from 1994 until the passing of the University of London Act 2018 they were "colleges", and from 2018 they have been "member institutions". A member institution is defined in the 2018 act as "an educational, academic or research institution which is a constituent member of the University and has for the time being — (a) the status of a college under the statutes; or (b) the status of a university". This had the effect of allowing institutions to change their status from colleges to universities in their own right while still remaining part of the University of London.

Intercollegiate Registration and study
Students from University of London colleges who wish to take a course at another college within the collegiate public university as part of their degree can register as intercollegiate students.

Degree powers
Until year 2008, all colleges within the federal collegiate system, solely awarded University of London degree.

From 2003 onwards some colleges received their own degree-awarding powers. However, these were held in abeyance until 2008, when a number of colleges began to award their own degrees.

Member institutions
The member institutions of the University of London are currently divided as follows, in alphabetical order:

Colleges

Birkbeck, University of London (BBK) 
City, University of London (CIT) 
Courtauld Institute of Art  
Goldsmiths, University of London (GUL) 
Institute of Cancer Research (ICR)  
King's College London (KCL) 
London Business School (LBS) 
The London School of Economics and Political Science (LSE) 
London School of Hygiene & Tropical Medicine (LSHTM) 
Queen Mary University of London (QMUL) 
Royal Academy of Music (RAM) 
Royal Central School of Speech and Drama (RCSSD) 
Royal Holloway, University of London (RHUL) 
Royal Veterinary College (RVC) 
St George's, University of London (SGUL) 
School of Oriental and African Studies (SOAS) 
University College London (UCL)

Former colleges
Bedford College 
Chelsea College 
Hackney College 
Heythrop College, University of London (HEY) 
Imperial College London (Imperial) 
Institute of Archaeology 
Institute of Education (IoE) 
New College London 
Queen Elizabeth College 
Regent's Park College 
Richmond Theological College 
School of Pharmacy, University of London 
School of Slavonic and East European Studies 
Westfield College 
Wye College

References

University of London